Bernard Spear (11 September 1919 – 9 May 2003) was an English actor.

Early life
Spear was born on 11 September 1919 in Croydon, Surrey, to a Polish-Jewish father and a Russian-Jewish mother. He was educated at Central Federation School in London, and worked as a clerk at a tobacco manufacturers before serving in the Royal Artillery in Gibraltar during World War II.

Career
Spear starred in the BAFTA TV Award-winning television play Bar Mitzvah Boy, and also portrayed the dual roles of Cervantes's manservant and Sancho Panza in the 1968 London stage version of Man of La Mancha. His film career includes roles in the films Drop Dead Darling (1966), Bedazzled (1967), Chitty Chitty Bang Bang (1968), The Adventures of Barry McKenzie (1972), Secrets of a Door-to-Door Salesman (1972), Wombling Free (1977) and Yentl (1983). His only regular role on television was as Morris Ransome in the soap opera Albion Market (1985–86).

Personal life
Spear married dancer/writer Mary Newton (pka Logan) in 1949; the couple had one child, Julian, owner of Julian Spear PR (an independent music promotion company for radio and television), who is married to actress Carol Royle.

Bernard and Mary remained married until his death in 2003.

Filmography

References

External links

1919 births
2003 deaths
20th-century English male actors
21st-century English male actors
Jewish English male actors
English people of Polish-Jewish descent
English people of Russian-Jewish descent
Royal Artillery personnel
British Army personnel of World War II
Male actors from London
People from Croydon
English male television actors
English male film actors
English Ashkenazi Jews
Military personnel from Surrey